Colonia Elisa Provincia del Chaco, Argentina.  Departamento Sargento Cabral.

External links

 Colonia Elisa website

Populated places in Chaco Province
Populated places established in 1909
1909 establishments in Argentina